Vivir a Destiempo is the eight studio album by Mexican singer Aranza featuring the titular theme from telenovela Vivir a Destiempo. It was released on August 1, 2013.

Background
Vivir a Destiempo features the single "Vivir a Destiempo" as well as other popular songs by Aranza and instrumental soundtracks from the telenovela. It is also available on iTunes.

References

2013 debut albums
Spanish-language albums